Manemergus is a genus of polycotylid plesiosaur from the Late Cretaceous (Turonian) of Morocco. Manemergus was described in 2005 and contains only one species, M. anguirostris. The type specimen was discovered close to the town of Goulmima (Tizi-n-Imnayen) in Morocco's High Atlas mountains, in the same locality as another polycotylid, Thililua, was discovered.

See also

 List of plesiosaur genera
 Timeline of plesiosaur research

References
Buchy, MC, Metayer, F, Frey, E, 2005. Osteology of Manemergus anguirostris n. gen. et sp., a new plesiosaur (Reptilia, Sauropterygia) from the Upper Cretaceous of Morocco. Palaeontographica Abteilung A-Palaozoologie-Stratigraphie 272 (5-6): 97–120. (Abstract)

Late Cretaceous plesiosaurs
Fossils of Morocco
Plesiosaurs of Africa
Polycotylids
Sauropterygian genera